Tabiano Terme is a frazione of the comune of Salsomaggiore Terme, from which is 4 kilometers distant, located at south of the pre-Apennines of Parma at 166 meters above the sea level.

External links

  Comune di Salsomaggiore Terme Official website of Salsomaggiore Terme.

Frazioni of the Province of Parma
Spa towns in Italy